Flammulina is a genus of fungi in the family Physalacriaceae. The genus, widespread in temperate regions, has been estimated to contain 10 species.

List of species

 Flammulina callistosporioides
 Flammulina elastica
 Flammulina fennae
 Flammulina ferrugineolutea
 Flammulina filiformis (enokitake)
 Flammulina finlandica
 Flammulina mediterranea
 Flammulina mexicana
 Flammulina ononidis
 Flammulina populicola
 Flammulina rossica
 Flammulina similis
 Flammulina stratosa
 Flammulina velutipes (velvet shank)

References

External links

 The Genus Flammulina

Physalacriaceae
Agaricales genera